Podgorny is a rural locality (a settlement) in Krutishinsky Selsoviet, Shelabolikhinsky District, Altai Krai, Russia. The population was 316 as of 2013. There are 2 streets.

Geography 
Podgorny is located 67 km west of Shelabolikha (the district's administrative centre) by road. Lugovoye is the nearest rural locality.

References 

Rural localities in Shelabolikhinsky District